Diasemia lunalis is a moth in the family Crambidae. It was described by Max Gaede in 1916. It is found in Burundi, Cameroon, Kenya, South Africa, Togo and Uganda.

References

Moths described in 1916
Spilomelinae